The Simulation Theory World Tour was a world concert tour by English rock band Muse, in support of their eighth studio album, Simulation Theory (2018). The tour began in Houston on 22 February 2019 and ended in Lima on 15 October 2019. Numerous acts appeared as the opening act, including Tom Morello, Walk the Moon, Nothing But Thieves and SWMRS.

The tour grossed $102 million, with more than 1.3 million tickets sold, based on 55 reported dates.

Muse – Simulation Theory, a film containing live footage from the shows at The O2 Arena in London from 14–15 September 2019, as well as additional filmed scenes, was released on 17 August 2020 in IMAX cinemas worldwide with a digital download release on 21 August.

Background
The Simulation Theory World Tour featured a new enhanced experience package that allowed access to an exclusive mixed reality pre-show party, powered by Microsoft. This included three original virtual reality games, inspired by tracks from Simulation Theory. Additional enhanced experience perks included a premium concert ticket, show-specific poster, interactive photo experience with props and memorabilia from the band's latest videos, and more.

Staging and Production
The staging was similar to The Unsustainable Tour of 2013, with a few differences. It consisted of a main stage, two stage wings and a long catwalk to the B-Stage, where certain songs were played from throughout the show. Behind the stage there was a large LED screen displaying various visuals. During the Metal Medley near the end of the show a large inflatable puppet skeleton called "Murph", similar to ones seen in the music video for "The Dark Side", was featured as if it were towering over the stage. The show also featured 14 dancers performing throughout the show during certain songs – some again linking to the music videos for the album.

The show loosely told the story of being caged in simulations with the world battling back and defeating them with the "creator" at the end of the show. This narrative was expanded upon in the Simulation Theory film with additional scenes.

Setlist

 "Algorithm" (Alternate Reality version)
 "Pressure"
 "Drill Sergeant" + "Psycho"
 "Break It to Me"
 "Uprising" 
 "Propaganda"
 "Plug in Baby"
 "Pray (High Valyrian)" (Matthew Bellamy cover)
 "The Dark Side"
 "Supermassive Black Hole"
 "Thought Contagion"
 "Interlude" + "Hysteria"
 "The 2nd Law: Unsustainable"
 "Dig Down" (Acoustic Gospel Version)
 "Madness"
 "Mercy"
 "Time is Running Out"
 "Houston Jam" (drum and bass jam, with "Futurism", "Unnatural Selection" and "Micro Cuts" riffs)
 "Take a Bow"
 "Prelude" + "Starlight"
Encore
"Algorithm"
 "Metal Medley" (Extracts from "Stockholm Syndrome", "Assassin", "Reapers", "The Handler", "New Born")
 "Man with a Harmonica" + "Knights of Cydonia"

Personnel 

 Matt Bellamy - lead vocals, guitars, piano, synthesizers on "Algorithm"
 Chris Wolstenholme - bass, backing vocals, guitar on "Dig Down (Acoustic Gospel Version)", percussion on "Pray (High Valyrian)", harmonica on "Man with a Harmonica"
 Dominic Howard - electric & acoustic drums, percussion, backing vocals on "Supermassive Black Hole", synthesizers on "Take a Bow"
 Morgan Nicholls - keyboards, synthesizers, backing vocals, percussion including cabasa on "Supermassive Black Hole", guitar on "Uprising", "Thought Contagion", "Mercy", & "Starlight"

Shows

Notes

References

Muse (band) concert tours
2019 concert tours